Vicente Lecaro (born 8 June 1936) is an Ecuadorian footballer. He played in eight matches for the Ecuador national football team from 1963 to 1967. He was also part of Ecuador's squad for the 1963 South American Championship.

References

1936 births
Living people
Ecuadorian footballers
Ecuador international footballers
Association football defenders
Sportspeople from Guayaquil